The Marshes Golf Club is a public golf club located in Ottawa, Ontario. The Marshes golf course was designed by Robert Trent Jones II.

Courses
 The Marshes  – opened in June 2002.  An 18-hole, par-72 championship course.
 The Marchwood – A 9-hole, par-27 short course.
 Blackbird Falls Putting Course – An 18-hole, par-42 putting course

Tournaments

The Marshes Golf Club hosted the Canadian PGA Seniors’ Championship from 2005 to 2009. The Marshes Golf Club hosted the 2015 World Junior Girls Championship. It also hosts local and provincial amateur championships.

See also
 List of golf courses in Canada

References

External links
 Marshes Golf Club website

 Marshes Golf Club Facebook

Golf clubs and courses in Ontario
Sports venues in Ottawa
2001 establishments in Ontario
Sports venues completed in 2001
Wesley Clover